George H. Edwards (May 25, 1860 - December 28, 1941) was Mayor of Kansas City, Missouri from 1916 to 1918.

Biography
Edwards was born on May 25, 1860 in St. Louis, Missouri and moved to Kansas City in 1888, first living at 609 Brooklyn Avenue and then 3533 Harrison Boulevard while mayor.

He was the secretary and manager of Edwards & Sloane Jewelry.

References

1860 births
1941 deaths
Mayors of Kansas City, Missouri
Politicians from St. Louis
Missouri Republicans